Tahlequah Municipal Airport  is a city-owned, public-use airport located two nautical miles (4 km) northwest of the central business district of Tahlequah, a city in Cherokee County, Oklahoma, United States. It is included in the National Plan of Integrated Airport Systems for 2011–2015, which categorized it as a general aviation facility.

Although most U.S. airports use the same three-letter location identifier for the FAA and IATA, this airport is assigned TQH by the FAA, but has no designation from the IATA.

Facilities and aircraft 
Tahlequah Municipal Airport covers an area of 125 acres (51 ha) at an elevation of 874 feet (266 m) above mean sea level. It has one runway designated 17/35 with an asphalt surface measuring 5,001 by 75 feet (1,524 x 23 m).

For the 12-month period ending September 22, 2011, the airport had 15,400 general aviation aircraft operations, an average of 42 per day. At that time there were 43 aircraft based at this airport: 86% single-engine, 12% multi-engine, and 2% helicopter.

References

External links 
 Airport page at City of Tahlequah website
 Tahlequah Municipal Airport (TQH) at Oklahoma Aeronautics Commission
 Aerial image as of March 1995 from USGS The National Map
 

Airports in Oklahoma
Buildings and structures in Cherokee County, Oklahoma